Robert Nettleton (16 September 1909 – 6 April 1972) was an Australian cricketer. He played two first-class cricket matches for Victoria between 1930 and 1931.

See also
 List of Victoria first-class cricketers

References

External links
 

1909 births
1972 deaths
Australian cricketers
Victoria cricketers
Cricketers from Melbourne